Jozef Maria Laurens Theo "Jo" Cals (18 July 1914 – 30 December 1971) was a Dutch politician of the defunct Catholic People's Party (KVP) now the Christian Democratic Appeal (CDA) party and jurist who served as Prime Minister of the Netherlands from 14 April 1965 until 22 November 1966.

Cals studied law at the Radboud University Nijmegen obtaining a Master of Laws degree and worked as a lawyer and prosecutor in Nijmegen from November 1940 until August 1948 and as researcher at his alma mater from February 1941 until May 1949. Cals also worked as a legal and economics teacher in Roermond from October 1943 until June 1945. Cals became a Member of the House of Representatives shortly after election of 1948 taking office on 19 August 1948 serving as a frontbencher and spokesperson for Education and Social Work. Following a cabinet reshuffle he was appointed as State Secretary for Education, Arts and Sciences in the Cabinet Drees–Van Schaik taking office on 15 March 1950. The Cabinet Drees–Van Schaik fell on 24 January 1951 and was replaced by Cabinet Drees I with Cals continuing his office. After the election of 1952 Cals was appointed as Minister of Education, Arts and Sciences in the Cabinet Drees II taking office on 2 September 1952. After the election of 1956 Cals retained his position in the Cabinet Drees III. The Cabinet Drees III fell on 11 December 1958 and was replaced by the caretaker Cabinet Beel II with Cals continuing his function. After the election of 1959 Cals once again retained his office in the Cabinet De Quay. After the election of 1963 Cals wasn't offered a cabinet post in the new cabinet and returned to the House of Representatives on 2 July 1963 serving as a frontbencher and spokesperson for the Interior and Kingdom Relations. Cals also became active in the public sector as a non-profit director and served on several state commissions and councils on behalf of the government.

After the fall of Cabinet Marijnen Cals was asked to lead a new cabinet. Following a successful cabinet formation Cals formed the Cabinet Cals and became Prime Minister of the Netherlands taking office on 14 April 1965. The cabinet fell just one year into its term after a major political crisis and following a difficult cabinet formation wasn't included in a new cabinet. Cals left office following the installation of the caretaker Cabinet Zijlstra on 22 November 1966 and announced his retirement.

Cals semi-retired from active politics at just 52 and became active in the private and public sectors as a corporate and non-profit director, and served as a diplomat and lobbyist for several economic delegations and presided over several state commissions and councils for the government. Cals was known for his abilities as a efficient manager and his work ethics. During his premiership, his cabinet were responsible for major social reforms to social security, closing the mines in Limburg and stimulating Urban development in the Randstad. Cals was granted the honorary title of Minister of State on 5 December 1966 and continued to comment on political affairs as a statesman until he was diagnosed with a terminal brain tumor and died in December 1971 at the age of just 57. He holds the distinction of as the fourth longest-serving cabinet member since 1850 with 14 years and 353 days and his premiership is consistently considered both by scholars and the public to have been average.

Biography

Early life

Jozef Maria Laurens Theo Cals was born in Roermond on 18 July 1914. After completing his secondary education in his home town, he studied for the priesthood in Rolduc. In 1935, however, he interrupted his theological training to study law at the Radboud University Nijmegen, after graduating in 1940 he practised law in that same city up until 1950, in the meantime also teaching economics at his old secondary school in Roermond.

Politics
In 1945 Cals became leader of the Catholic People's Party in the municipal council of Nijmegen until 1946. He was elected as a Member of the House of Representatives in 1948. From 15 March 1950 to 2 September 1952 he was State Secretary for Education, Arts and Sciences, serving from 15 March 1950 until 2 September 1952 in the Drees-Van Schaik and Drees I cabinets. He became Minister of Education, Arts and Sciences serving from 2 September 1952 until 24 July 1963 in the cabinets Drees II and III, Beel II and De Quay, he helped pass the Mammoetwet, a law that transformed secondary education. In the debate, he spoke for 6 hours and 50 minutes, setting a record. In 1963, however, he returned to the House of Representatives. Alongside his duties there, he was a member of the board of governors of the University of Groningen, chairman of the Arts Council and a member of the Press Council.

In the aftermath of the collapse of the Marijnen cabinet, Cals became Prime Minister of the Netherlands on 14 April 1965. After two decades of economic growth, his cabinet experienced a slight recession. Plans to build sports halls, roads and houses had to be tempered. In Limburg the coal mines were closed and plans were drawn to educate and re-employ the former miners. There was also social unrest ('the sixties'), which became apparent in the Provo movement, construction worker protests, riots over the marriage of princess Beatrix in Amsterdam and the rise of new parties like Farmers' Party (BP), Pacifist Socialist Party (PSP), Reformed Political League (GPV) and the Democrats 66 (D'66). Especially the last party wanted to change the political order .

On 14 October 1966 Norbert Schmelzer the Leader of the Catholic People's Party and Parliamentary leader of the Catholic People's Party in the House of Representatives proposed a Motion of no confidence against the cabinet and Prime Minister Cals. A shocking and surprised action in Dutch politics, it marked the first time that a motion of no confidence was proposed against a cabinet of the same party. The cabinet resigned that evening.

Scouting
Cals was in 1930, just after the foundation as a separate Scouting organisation, one of the first members of De Katholieke Verkenners (The Catholic Scouts). He went to the 4th World Scout Jamboree in Gödöllo, Hungary in 1933. After the liberation of the southern part of the Netherlands in 1944 he was one of the main forces in rebuilding Catholic Scouting as a separate Scouting movement in the Netherlands. During his second term as Minister of Education, Arts and Sciences, the State Secretary for Education, Arts and Sciences was his former Scout Master René Höppener.

Trivia
Between 1968 and 1970, Cals was in charge of the Dutch entry to the Expo '70 in Japan. From 1967 he was chairman of the National Advisory Committee on the amendment of the Constitution.

Cals was a hard worker but this was at the expense of his health, he died from a brain tumor in the MCH Westeinde hospital in The Hague on 30 December 1971 at the age of 57.

Decorations

References

External links

  Mr. J.M.L.Th. (Jo) Cals Parlement & Politiek
  Kabinet-Cals Rijksoverheid

 

 
 

 
 

 
 

 
 

 
 
 

1914 births
1971 deaths
Catholic People's Party politicians
Commanders of the Order of the Netherlands Lion
Deaths from brain cancer in the Netherlands
Dutch academic administrators
Dutch corporate directors
20th-century Dutch judges
Dutch legal educators
Dutch lobbyists
Dutch nonprofit directors
Dutch nonprofit executives
Dutch people of World War II
Dutch prosecutors
Dutch Roman Catholics
Knights Grand Cross of the Order of Orange-Nassau
Knights of the Holy Sepulchre
Members of the House of Representatives (Netherlands)
Ministers of Education of the Netherlands
Ministers of General Affairs of the Netherlands
Ministers of State (Netherlands)
Municipal councillors of Nijmegen
Oxfam people
People from Nijmegen
People from Roermond
Politicians from The Hague
Prime Ministers of the Netherlands
Radboud University Nijmegen alumni
Academic staff of Radboud University Nijmegen
Royal Netherlands Army officers
Royal Netherlands Army personnel of World War II
Roman Catholic State Party politicians
Scouting and Guiding in the Netherlands
State Secretaries for Education of the Netherlands
Academic staff of the University of Groningen
20th-century Dutch businesspeople
20th-century Dutch civil servants
20th-century Dutch diplomats
20th-century Dutch educators
20th-century Dutch politicians